The Ajlad was a Turkic tribe or clan. They were one of seven original tribes that made up the Kimek confederation. They originated from the Central Asian steppes.

The Ajlad were one of seven original tribes that made up the Kimek confederation, along with the Imur/Imi, Imak, Tatar, Kipchak, Bayandur and Lanikaz. The Kimek tribes originated in the Central Asian steppes and had migrated to the territory of present-day Kazakhstan. The Ajlad, as part of the Kimek, were mentioned by Gardizi.

References

Sources
 
 

Turkic peoples of Asia
Kimek confederation
Extinct Turkic peoples